War Drum Studios LLC, doing business as Grove Street Games since 2020, is an American video game developer based in Gainesville, Florida. The company was founded as War Drum Studios in October 2007 by Thomas Williamson and Michael Owen. It is known for developing mobile game ports, including several based on Rockstar Games properties.

History 
Grove Street Games was founded as War Drum Studios by Thomas Williamson and Michael Owen. Williamson had been the technology director for Artificial Studios and Owen a programmer at Gainesville Regional Utilities. After Williamson left Artificial Studios in 2007, he and Owen established War Drum Studios in Gainesville, Florida, on October 1, 2007. They became the chief executive officer and chief technology officer, respectively. The company immediately began doing contract work, starting with porting Ghostbusters: The Video Game from the Wii to the PlayStation 2. By August 2011, War Drum Studios had five employees. Around that time, the company was developing an original game, Chess: Revolution, alongside a free derivative codenamed Little Green Robots that starred the mascot of the Android operating system as chess pieces.

In 2019, War Drum Studios named Morgan Hughes as chief operating officer. Hughes had joined the company as an intern in 2008 and had been the art director since 2010. In August 2020, War Drum Studios rebranded as Grove Street Games, adopting the name of Gainesville's Grove Street neighborhood in which the company was based. Later that year, the company became a member of the Coalition for App Fairness.

Games developed

References

External links 
 

2007 establishments in Florida
Companies based in Gainesville, Florida
Video game companies established in 2007
Video game companies of the United States
Video game development companies